The 2014 season was Malmö FF's 103rd in existence, their 79th season in Allsvenskan and their 14th consecutive season in the league. They competed in Allsvenskan where they finished first, 2013–14 Svenska Cupen where they were knocked out in the semi-finals, Svenska Supercupen where they won the competition against IF Elfsborg and the 2014–15 UEFA Champions League where they were knocked out in the group stage. Malmö FF also participated in one competition in which the club continued playing in for the 2015 season, 2014–15 Svenska Cupen. This season was the first time since the 2005 season that the club played consecutive seasons in European competition. The season began with the group stage of Svenska Cupen on 1 March, league play started on 30 March and concluded on 1 November. The season concluded with the last Champions League group stage match on 9 December.

For the second consecutive season, the club had to appoint a new club captain as Jiloan Hamad left the club after the previous season. Midfielder Guillermo Molins was chosen as Hamad's successor as club captain, Markus Rosenberg took over the captaincy temporarily after the first half of the season as Molins was out with an injury for the rest of the year. Åge Hareide was appointed as the club's new manager on 9 January 2014, this was after Rikard Norling announced his resignation on 27 November 2013.

Malmö FF qualified for the group stage of the UEFA Champions League for the first time in the club's history. They were also the first Swedish club to qualify in 14 years since Helsingborgs IF in the 2000–01 season. The club won their second consecutive league title, their 18th Swedish championship title and 21st Allsvenskan title on 5 October 2014 when they defeated AIK in an away fixture at Friends Arena in the 27th round of the league. Malmö FF became the first Swedish club to win back to back league titles in eleven years, the last club to achieve this feat was Djurgårdens IF in 2003. The last time Malmö FF won consecutive league titles was in 1989 and consecutive Swedish championships in 1975.

Summary

Allsvenskan

The league season started on 30 March 2014 and concluded on 1 November 2014. The official season fixtures were released on 20 December 2013. Malmö FF started the season with a home fixture against newcomers Falkenbergs FF on 30 March, Malmö FF won the match 3–0. The season featured a summer break due to the 2014 FIFA World Cup held between 12 June and 13 July, Malmö FF played no league matches between 1 June and 6 July. The club played its last league fixture of the season away against Åtvidabergs FF on 1 November, Åtvidaberg won the match 2–1.

The club got off to a strong start with four wins in the first matches against Falkenbergs FF, IFK Göteborg, Gefle IF and Örebro SK, not conceding a goal until the fourth match. As a result of this Malmö FF took the lead in the league table from the first round of matches. The club's first loss of points came in the fifth round with a 2–2 home draw against Djurgårdens IF, a club which Malmö FF had lost both matches against in the previous season. After bouncing back with a win in the sixth round in an away fixture against IFK Norrköping, the club lost its first league match at home against BK Häcken 1–2. Nevertheless, Malmö FF held on to pole position in the league table and proceeded to win three matches in a row after the loss against Häcken. This string of matches included the Scanian derby away against Helsingborgs IF, a home fixture against Halmstads BK and the away fixture against Mjällby AIF, a club Malmö FF had never previously defeated at Strandvallen. The eleventh round of league play saw Malmö FF meet pre-season favourites AIK in a home fixture that ended 2–2 after Malmö FF had come back from a 0–2 score. The last fixture of the spring season was an away fixture against IF Elfsborg at Borås Arena on 1 June, the venue where Malmö FF secured last season's league title. Malmö FF won the match 1–0 and created a six points margin down to Elfsborg and Kalmar FF who were positioned second and third respectively.

After the 2014 FIFA World Cup, Malmö FF faced IF Brommapojkarna in an away fixture on 6 July, a match that finished in a 1–1 draw after a fairly uneventful match. This was followed up with a 3–0 home win against Åtvidabergs FF before another away draw against Kalmar FF. After having played 15 out of 30 league fixtures Malmö FF were still six points ahead of the team in second place, AIK. The club maintained the six-point gap in the two following fixtures, by winning 3–1 at home against Kalmar and defeating newcomers Falkenberg 5–2 on the road. The six-point gap was reduced down to a four-point lead after a drawn home fixture against IFK Göteborg in the 18th round as AIK won their fixture in the same round. However, the lead was again increased to six points in the following round as Malmö FF turned 0–2 at half-time against Örebro at home to 3–2 in full-time in the 19th round. The lead was increased further to a seven-point gap in the 20th round when Malmö FF tied an away fixture against Gefle at the same time as AIK lost against Örebro.

Following a home win against Norrköping, Malmö FF entered a period of win-less games starting with a 2–0 loss against Djurgården in the 22nd round. This decreased the club's lead to four points in the league table. Malmö FF followed to play two draws, 3–3 in the away fixture against Häcken where the club came back from a 3–1 deficit and 1–1 in the Scanian derby at home against Helsingborg where Markus Rosenbergs late goal was equalized in the following minute by the away team. This was the first time Malmö FF played three matches without a win since May 2013. However, AIK and other teams chasing Malmö FF in the top of the table failed to capitalize on the club's shortage of points and Malmö FF's lead was instead increased to six points with only six matches left to play. In the next round, Malmö FF defeated Halmstad away, this was the club's seventh successive victory at Örjans Vall since 2007. The win meant an eight-point difference to the nearest competitor in the table, Elfsborg. The lead was increased to nine points in the following round as Malmö FF won the home against Mjällby, 4–1, while Elfsborg saw themselves passed by IFK Göteborg. These results made it possible for Malmö FF to secure the league title in the 27th round in the away game against title competitors AIK at Friends Arena on 5 October. As IFK Göteborg and Elfsborg lost their matches before kick-off between Malmö FF and AIK, the club needed a draw to secure the title. The club's 18th Swedish championship and 21st Allsvenskan title was won after a 3–2 win against AIK. The result meant a 12-point lead with only nine points left to play for in the last three fixtures.

With nothing left to play for in the last three matches, Malmö FF only managed to gather three points out of nine. In the 28th round the club hosted Elfsborg at home, Elfsborg won the match 2–1 after two goals in the second half for the guests. The last home game of the season against Brommapojkarna ended in a 2–0 win in a match full of chances for the home team. The last match of the league season took place on 1 November at Kopparvallen against Åtvidaberg. Malmö FF took the lead in the first half with a goal from former Åtvidaberg player Anton Tinnerholm who joined Malmö FF in the summer of 2014. Åtvidaberg managed to turn the game around and won 2–1, the last goal being scored by Kristian Bergström who had previously played for Malmö FF. This goal also made Bergström the league's oldest goalscorer of all time at 40 years of age. After the game, Malmö FF were presented with the league trophy Lennart Johanssons Pokal.

Svenska Cupen
Malmö FF qualified for the group stage of the 2013–14 Svenska Cupen in the 2013 season by beating Sävedalens IF 6–0 on 21 August 2013. The club was seeded first in the group stage draw after finishing first in the 2013 Allsvenskan. The groups were drawn on 13 November 2013 and Malmö FF were drawn against three clubs from the 2013 Superettan, fourth-placed Degerfors IF, fifth-placed Hammarby IF and sixth-placed Ängelholms FF. The group stage was played between 1 and 15 March 2014 before the start of the league season.

The first match was a home fixture against Degerfors IF at Malmö IP on 1 March, Malmö FF won the match 7–1 after a hat-trick by Simon Kroon. The second match was an away fixture against Ängelholms FF on 8 March, a Scanian derby, Malmö FF won the match 3–0. The fixture was played at Malmö IP as Ängelholms IP was not approved for play, Ängelholm was technically designated as the home team for the fixture. The third and final match was a home fixture against Hammarby IF on 15 March at Malmö Stadion which Malmö FF won 3–2, this was the first meeting between the two clubs since Hammarby was relegated to Superettan after the 2009 Allsvenskan season. With an attendance of 8,276 Malmö FF set a new record attendance for a match in the Svenska Cup group stage.

Malmö FF won the group and advanced to the quarter-finals where they faced fellow Allsvenskan club IF Brommapojkarna. The quarter-finals were drawn on 17 March, the club was seeded in the draw after finishing as one of the four best group winners. The quarter-final was played at home on 22 March, Malmö FF won the match 2–0. The semi-finals were drawn on 25 March with Malmö FF drawn against rivals Helsingborgs IF in a home fixture. The Scanian derby was played at Swedbank Stadion on 1 May with Helsingborg winning the match 2–0. Helsingborg advanced to the final at Friends Arena on 18 May where they lost to IF Elfsborg.

The draw for the second round of the 2014–15 Svenska Cupen was held on 7 August. Malmö FF faced Division 1 side IS Halmia at Örjans Vall on 15 November. The match was initially planned to be played in August but was postponed due to Malmö FF's participation in the qualification for the UEFA Champions League. Malmö FF won 2–1 after extra time and progressed to the group stage to be held in March 2015.

Svenska Supercupen
Malmö FF qualified for the 2014 Svenska Supercupen by winning the 2014 Allsvenskan on 5 October 2014. The match was played at home at Malmö Stadion on 9 November 2014 and the club's opponents were the 2013–14 Svenska Cupen winners IF Elfsborg. This was the second successive and third time in total that the club competed in Svenska Supercupen. Malmö FF won their second successive title after winning 5–4 on penalties after the match had ended 2–2 after extra time. Isaac Kiese Thelin scored Malmö FF's first goal in the 89th minute of ordinary time, equalizing Elfsborg's 1–0 lead. In the second half of extra time Emil Forsberg made it 2–1 to Malmö FF before Elfsborg could equalize to 2–2 after having scored a penalty in the 120th minute. In the penalty shoot-out Malmö FF scored in five out of six penalties while Elfsborg scored four, Erdal Rakip scored the match-winning penalty.

UEFA Champions League

Malmö FF qualified for the 2014–15 UEFA Champions League by merit of finishing first in the 2013 Allsvenskan. The club entered the competition in the second round of qualification. The draw for the second qualifying round was held on 23 June, Malmö FF was unseeded in the draw. The club was drawn against the 2013 Latvian champions FK Ventspils. This was only the second time that Malmö FF faced Latvian opposition in European competition, and the first time since 1996. The first leg of the fixture was played at home on 16 July and ended in a 0–0 draw after a game of few chances from either side. The away fixture at Ventspils Olimpiskais Stadions was played on 23 July and ended with a 1–0 win for Malmö FF, thus taking them through to the third qualifying round with 1–0 on aggregate.

Malmö FF faced Czech side Sparta Prague in the third qualifying round, Malmö FF were unseeded in the draw held on 18 July. The first leg was played at the Generali Arena in Prague on 29 July and ended in a 4–2 defeat for Malmö FF after leading 2–1 at half-time. The second leg was played on 6 August at Swedbank Stadion in Malmö and ended with a 2–0 win for Malmö FF. The tie ended in a 4–4 draw with Malmö FF advancing due to the away goals rule. This was the second time Malmö FF faced a club from the Czech Republic in European competition and the first time since 1996.

The draw for the play-off round was held on 8 August, Malmö FF was unseeded in the draw. The club was drawn against Austrian champions Red Bull Salzburg. This was the third time Malmö FF faced Austrian opposition in European competition, the last time being in the group stage of the 2011–12 UEFA Europa League against Austria Wien. The first leg of the tie was played at Red Bull Arena in Wals-Siezenheim on 19 August. The match ended in a 2–1 defeat for Malmö FF after Emil Forsberg scored a late goal in the 90th minute. The second leg was played at home at Swedbank Stadion on 27 August and ended in a 3–0 win for Malmö FF which made it 4–2 on aggregate. Thus the club qualified for the group stage of the UEFA Champions League for the first time in their history. They were also the first Swedish club to qualify in 14 years since Helsingborgs IF in the 2000–01 season.

The draw for the group stage was held on 28 August 2014 in Monaco, France. Malmö FF were seeded in pot 4 which consisted of the lowest ranked teams. The club was drawn against 2014 UEFA Champions League finalists and Spanish champions Atlético Madrid, Italian champions Juventus and Greek champions Olympiacos. Malmö FF played their first match of the group stage, an away fixture against Juventus on 16 September, and concluded the group stage on 9 December with an away fixture against Olympiacos. In the six group stage matches Malmö FF gathered three points and ended up in fourth place, thus being knocked out of the Champions League and further European competition for the 2014–15 season. In the six matches the club won one match, the home fixture against Olympiacos 2–0, and lost the other five matches. Olympiacos was also the only team that Malmö FF managed to score against, scoring two in the home match and two in the 4–2 away loss.

Key events

 30 October 2013: Midfielder and captain Jiloan Hamad leaves the club, transferring to Hoffenheim.
 25 November 2013: Midfielder Ivo Pękalski leaves the club, transferring to BK Häcken.
 27 November 2013: Manager Rikard Norling announces his resignation from the club.
 3 December 2013: Defender Mahmut Özen joins the club on a four-year contract, transferring from Mjällby AIF.
 9 December 2013: Defender Johan Hammar signs a new three-year contract, keeping him at the club until the end of the 2016 season.
 23 December 2013: Goalkeeper and vice captain Johan Dahlin leaves the club, transferring to Gençlerbirliği.
 9 January 2014: The club announces the appointment of Åge Hareide as the new manager. Goalkeeper Zlatan Azinović joins the club on a two-year contract, transferring from Kalmar FF.
 21 January 2014: Forward Dardan Rexhepi leaves the club, transferring to IF Brommapojkarna.
 30 January 2014: Midfielder Erik Friberg leaves the club, transferring to Bologna. Midfielder Guillermo Molins is chosen as the club's new captain.
 3 February 2014: Forward Markus Rosenberg joins the club on a three-year contract, transferring from West Bromwich Albion.
 14 February 2014: Forward Alexander Nilsson leaves the club on loan to Trelleborgs FF for the duration of the season.
 19 February 2014: Defender Pa Konate leaves the club on loan to Östers IF for the duration of the season. At the same time he signs a new four-year contract, keeping him at the club until the end of the 2017 season.
 21 February 2014: Forward Benjamin Fadi leaves the club on loan to IFK Värnamo until 15 July 2014.
 3 March 2014: Forward Petter Thelin leaves the club on loan to Skellefteå FF for the duration of the season.
 11 March 2014: Defender Tobias Malm leaves the club on loan to Östersunds FK for the duration of the season.
 14 March 2014: Goalkeeper Sixten Mohlin signs a new five-year contract, keeping him at the club until the end of the 2018 season.
 24 March 2014: Midfielder Petar Petrović signs a new three and a half year contract, keeping him at the club until the end of the 2017 season.
 12 June 2014: Defender Pontus Jansson leaves the club, transferring to Torino.
 20 June 2014: Defender Miiko Albornoz leaves the club, transferring to Hannover.
 1 July 2014: Midfielder Pawel Cibicki signs a new three and a half year contract, keeping him at the club until the end of the 2017 season.
 5 July 2014: Forward Isaac Kiese Thelin joins the club on a three and a half year contract, transferring from IFK Norrköping.
 8 July 2014: Midfielder Enoch Kofi Adu joins the club on a three and a half year contract, transferring from Club Brugge.
 10 July 2014: Midfielder Piotr Johansson is promoted to the first team squad on a youth contract basis.
 11 July 2014: Defender Anton Tinnerholm joins the club on a three and a half year contract, transferring from Åtvidabergs FF.
 14 July 2014: Forward Benjamin Fadi extends his loan agreement with IFK Värnamo so it covers the rest of the season.
 15 July 2014: Midfielder Erdal Rakip signs a new three and a half year contract, keeping him at the club until the end of the 2017 season.
 15 July 2014: Defender Mahmut Özen leaves the club on loan to Kayseri Erciyesspor for the duration of the 2014–15 season.
 15 July 2014: Forward Agon Mehmeti joins the club on a three and a half year contract, transferring from Palermo.
 23 July 2014: Defender Jasmin Sudić leaves the club, transferring to Mjällby AIF.
 24 July 2014: Midfielder Petar Petrović leaves the club on loan to Radnički Niš for the duration of the season.
 5 October 2014: Malmö FF wins their 18th Swedish championship and their 21st Allsvenskan title after defeating AIK with 3–2.
 6 November 2014: Goalkeeper Robin Olsen is selected as Allsvenskan goalkeeper of the year, midfielder Emil Forsberg is selected as Allsvenskan midfielder of the year, forward Markus Rosenberg is selected as Allsvenskan forward of the year and Allsvenskan most valuable player of the year and head coach Åge Hareide is selected as Allsvenskan manager of the year.
 9 November 2014: Malmö FF wins their 2nd Svenska Supercupen title after defeating IF Elfsborg in the final after penalties.
 11 November 2014: Forward Magnus Eriksson's goal against Red Bull Salzburg on 27 August 2014 is selected as Swedish goal of the year.

Players

Squad

Youth players with first-team appearances 
Youth players who played a competitive match for the club in 2014.

Squad stats

Players in/out

In

Out

Disciplinary record

Club

Coaching staff

Other information

Competitions

Overall

Allsvenskan

League table

Results summary

Results by round

Matches
Kickoff times are in UTC+2 unless stated otherwise.

Svenska Cupen

2013–14
The tournament continued from the 2013 season.

Kickoff times are in UTC+1 unless stated otherwise.

Group stage

Knockout stage

2014–15
The tournament continued into the 2015 season.

Qualification stage

Svenska Supercupen

UEFA Champions League

Qualifying phase and play-off round

Kickoff times are in UTC+2 unless stated otherwise.

Second qualifying round

Third qualifying round

Play-off round

Group stage

Times up to 25 October 2014 (matchdays 1–3) are CEST (UTC+2), thereafter (matchdays 4–6) times are CET (UTC+1).

Non competitive

Pre-season
Kickoff times are in UTC+1 unless stated otherwise.

Mid-season
Kickoff times are in UTC+2 unless stated otherwise.

Post-season

References

Malmö FF seasons
Malmo FF season
Malmo
Swedish football championship-winning seasons